Mariachi Plaza is a plaza located in the Boyle Heights district of the city of Los Angeles, California. The plaza is known for its history as a center for mariachi music. Since the 1950s, mariachi musicians have gathered in hopes of being hired by visitors who are looking for a full band, trio or solo singer. The plaza resembles Mexico's famed Plaza Garibaldi in both form and function and is also a historic gateway to the neighborhood.

History

As early as the 1930s, the area between Boyle Avenue and Bailey Street functioned as an informal gathering place for mariachis seeking work. In the 1950s a mariachi named Juan M. Gonzalez, "El Cochero" (the Coachman), also known as the fundador (founder) of "La Boyle" is said to have stopped at the gas station that once stood on the corner and wandered around the neighborhood where he found $7 per week rooms to rent, and told his mariachi friends to join him there. Since then, musicians wait around the plaza and hotel—now an affordable living complex—to be hired. In the early 1980s the Department of Cultural Affairs and Metro formulated a plan to transform the gathering space into a legitimate public square. On November 22, 1992 (the feast day of Saint Cecilia) the groundbreaking for the new Plaza del Mariachi de Los Angeles took place. Six years later, in 1998, the State of Jalisco, Mexico funded the addition of a traditional Cantera stone kiosk which was designed, hand carved, and assemble by Guadalajaran stone artisan Juan Pablo Salas. The kiosk located in the plaza, similar to those found in Mexico.  The kiosk is ornamental and has been criticized for its poor acoustics. In 2001, the State of Jalisco continued to support the developing plaza with the donation of seventeen wrought iron benches, representing municipalities in Jalisco.

Description

Mariachi plaza has taken on the identity as the historic gateway and is the location of many celebrations, festivals and community events. A bandstand was added in 2009. Local leaders hope to promote the plaza and for it to remain a sanctuary for musicians. Every November, the feast day of Santa Cecilia is celebrated at Mariachi Plaza with a procession of mariachis.

The plaza is bounded by E. 1st Street to the south, N. Boyle Avenue to the west, and a small residential street named Pleasant Avenue to its north. It is surrounded by the East Los Angeles Interchange, and is located between Interstates 5, 10, and 101.

On Mexican Independence Day 2022, Boyle Heights honored Mexican ranchera legend Vicente Fernández nickname, Chente. A purple curtain dropped, and a stretch of Bailey Street bordering Mariachi Plaza was renamed Vicente Fernández Street. The length of Vicente Fernández Street stretches about 400 feet from the edge of Mariachi Plaza to the gates of Adventist Health White Memorial Hospital (a two-block segment). It sits between 1st Street and Pennsylvania Avenue near the historic Mariachi Plaza. Papel picado strung across, adorned Mariachi Plaza, where a crowd was serenaded by live musicians on loudspeakers. Fernández's widow, Maria del Refugio Abarca Villaseñor, known as “Doña Cuquita,” attended the unveiling ceremony, along with other local elected officials. Mariachi musicians and dancers perform at the naming ceremony, his legendary songs  (English: The state of nature) by songwriter José Ángel Espinoza. The songs name is an expression that has come to describe a scenario where life's contract imposes restrictions upon individuals that curtail their natural rights and "El Rey" (English: "The King")  by José Alfredo Jiménez song at the closing ceremony. Fernández is the second ranchera legend whose name graces Bailey Street. Pioneering singer Lucha Reyes has a statue in Mariachi Plaza and signs along Bailey Street, placed in 2014, welcoming visitors to Avenida Lucha Reyes.

Transportation

Metro Rail station 

The Los Angeles Metropolitan Transportation Authority has a light rail subway station open in 2009 under the plaza on the Eastside extension of the Gold Line. The plaza has a direct route into Downtown Los Angeles and a connection to other lines of the Metro. As of 2020, there is a proposal to redevelop the square, though it is highly contested by local residents and mariachis.

Mariachi Plaza Metro Station Art/Design
Metro's Mariachi Plaza Station opened in 2009 as part of the Gold line eastside extension. The entrance to the station is located in what many consider to be the heart of the community. Its large scalloped canopy features Diamon-shaped glass cut outs, which reflect their festive colors onto the escalators below. The bronze sculpture below the canopy, title ″El Nino Perdido″, was created by Alejandro de la Loza an artist born in Mexico City and raised in Boyle Heights. When envisioning the piece, Loza took inspiration from the popular Mexican instrumental song "El Nino Perdido" (the lost child). A favorite among mariachis, the hundred year old song is centered around two trumpeters playing at  distance from one another, one representing a parent and the other representing a lost child. At the end of the song, the two trumpeters will often meet face-to-face, signifying the reunion of the parent and the child. Additional works in the collection can be found below, within the station itself.

Lucha Reyes (Maria de Luz Flores Aceves) has a statue in the plaza as she visited the city many times during her career. known as the "mother of ranchera music" stands behind the kiosk, acting as a muse to the local mariachis.

Artist Juan Solis, born in Zacatecas, Mexico and raised in East Los Angeles was commissioned to paint two large panel murals. He painted figures of men and women in traditional folkloric dress, representing the cultural heritage of Mexico's various regions. On the second mural, he painted a mural of Our Lady of Guadalupe.

In popular culture
Owing to its musical history, several music videos have been filmed at Mariachi Plaza, such as the music videos for Lupita Infante's Cucurrucucú Paloma, La Santa Cecilia's "Calaverita", Loona's "Butterfly", and Beatriz Gonzalez's "Los Laureles".

A season 4 episode of Agents of S.H.I.E.L.D. was filmed at Mariachi Plaza.

The film How to Be a Latin Lover was partially filmed at Mariachi Plaza.

Michael Connelly's crime thriller novel The Burning Room focuses on a murder which takes place at Mariachi Plaza.

Mariachi: A Tale of Three Lives, a short KCET-TV documentary, featured Mariachi Plaza. Starring Jose Hernandez, and El Cochero's son, Aguja.

References 

Boyle Heights, Los Angeles
Parks in Los Angeles
Squares and plazas in Los Angeles
Landmarks in Los Angeles
Eastside Los Angeles